European Urology is a monthly peer-reviewed medical journal covering urology. It was established in 1975 and is published by Elsevier. It is the official journal of the European Association of Urology. The editor-in-chief is James Catto (University of Sheffield). The 2021 Impact Factor for the Journal is, 24.267.

References

External links

Urology journals
Elsevier academic journals
Publications established in 1975
Monthly journals
English-language journals